Bebresh Viaduct (виадукт „Бебреш“) is a girder bridge part of the Bulgarian Hemus (or A2) motorway, located in Vitinya Pass in Stara Planina 60 km east of Sofia, at 650 m above sea level. It was opened in 1985 and was designed by the team of D. Dragoev, P. Minchev and Y. Todorov of Moststroy AD.

The viaduct is 720 m long and has 12 spans 60 m each. Rising 120 m above the ground, it is also regarded as the highest bridge in the Balkans and Bulgaria, with the precast post-tensioned girders being produced at the place and special equipment being used for the assembly. The Bebresh Viaduct is a favoured place for bungee jumping due to its height.

References
 
 Bebresh Viaduct in the Bridges in Bulgaria album
 Aerial Photo in Google

Bridges completed in 1985
Buildings and structures in Sofia Province
Botevgrad Municipality
Bridges in Bulgaria
Viaducts